Matthew Jon van Eldik (born 16 May 1970) is a Paralympic athletics competitor from Australia.  He won a  bronze medal at the 1988 Seoul Games in the Men's Slalom C4-5 event.

References

External links
 Matthew van Eldik at Australian Athletics Historical Results
 

Paralympic athletes of Australia
Athletes (track and field) at the 1988 Summer Paralympics
Paralympic bronze medalists for Australia
Living people
Medalists at the 1988 Summer Paralympics
1970 births
Place of birth missing (living people)
Paralympic medalists in athletics (track and field)